David Ivanovich Jensen (Russian: Давид Иванович Йенсен, 19 November 1816, Copenhagen - 23 January 1902, Saint Petersburg) was a Russian decorative sculptor and art professor.

Biography 
His father, Jens Holmgren, was a carpenter. He studied at the Royal Danish Academy of Fine Arts, under the direction of Bertel Thorvaldsen. In 1841, the Academy awarded him  a large gold medal for his bas-relief of Christ in the house of Martha and Mary.

That same year, he was one of many who received a commission to do sculptural work at the new palace of Grand Duchess Maria Nikolaevna of Russia (now known as the Marinsky Palace). His contribution consisted mainly of bas-reliefs and caryatids. In 1845, for his bas-relief of Chiron teaching Achilles to use a bow, he was granted the title of "Free Artist" by the Imperial Academy of Arts.

From 1843 to 1847, he also taught drawing at the Imperial Society for the Encouragement of the Arts. His students included Alexander Opekushin and Léopold Bernhard Bernstamm.

In 1857, he was granted Russian citizenship and named an "Academician" for his bas-relief of Achilles with the body of Hector. The Academy awarded him the title of Professor in 1868, for his statue of Diana. He died in 1902 and was interred at the Smolensky Lutheran Cemetery.

Most of his work was done for the Romanovs. In addition to Marinsky Palace, his works adorn the New Hermitage, the Beloselsky-Belozersky Palace, the Saint Petersburg Manege, and the Imperial Rooms of the Tsarskoye Selo Railway, among many others. The Bolshoi Drama Theater, the Grand Choral Synagogue and the Grand Hotel Europe are his most notable non-Royal commissions. His few monuments include one for the Scottish-born surgeon, Sir James Wylie.

Sources
 
 S. N. Kondakov: Юбилейный справочник Императорской Академии художеств. 1764-1914 (Anniversary Reference Book of the Imperial Academy), Golike and Vilborg, 1915, pp.255—256
 F. I. Bulgakov: Наши художники (Our Artists), A. S. Suvorina Publishing, 1889, pp,160—161

External links 

 Brief biography @ the Encyclopedia Saint Petersburg
 Detailed biography @ the Golden Palette Art Journal
 David Jensen: Behind the Façade @ the Danish Cultural Institute (in Russian)

1816 births
1902 deaths
Russian sculptors
Danish emigrants to Russia
Artists from Copenhagen
Burials at Smolensky Lutheran Cemetery